Thomas Suluk (Inuktitut: ᑖᒪᔅ ᓱᓗᒃ, March 14, 1950 – October 13, 2018) is a Canadian former politician. He represented the electoral district of Nunatsiaq in the House of Commons of Canada from 1984 to 1988 as a member of the Progressive Conservatives.

Biography 
Thomas Suluk was born on March 14, 1950, in Arviat, then part of the Northwest Territories. After graduating from Arthur Turner Anglican Theological School in Pangnirtung, on Baffin Island, Suluk was posted to Apex, Iqaluit. However, at age 22, he was one year too young to go through the process of ordination. Instead of waiting, Suluk chose to enter politics, during a time when Inuit were beginning to learn of land claims and their civil rights. He began in his local council office, but moved on to working for Inuit Tapiriit Kanatami, as he had an interest in broader community issues.

After working as a Canadian Broadcasting Corporation radio announcer for a short period, Suluk won an election to the House of Commons of Canada at the 1984 federal election, representing the electoral district of Nunatsiaq (now Nunavut). His election was close - his Progressive Conservative candidacy narrowly defeated the Liberal candidate, Robert Kuptana, by just 247 votes. During his time in Parliament, Suluk focused on land claims issues in Nunavut, and was also involved with the Tungavik Federation of Nunavut (now Nunavut Tunngavik Incorporated), which was at the time the peak organisation tasked with negotiating land claims and treaties for Inuit. Suluk did not contest the seat at the following election.

After his brief role in politics, Suluk opened a coffeeshop in Arviat, and as of 2008 was working on the 2007/8 Inuit Health Survey.

Electoral record

References

External links

1950 births
Living people
Members of the House of Commons of Canada from the Northwest Territories
Progressive Conservative Party of Canada MPs
Inuit politicians
People from Arviat
Inuit from the Northwest Territories
Indigenous Members of the House of Commons of Canada
Inuit from Nunavut